The 2009 ICF Canoe Sprint World Championships were held 12–16 August 2009 in Dartmouth, Nova Scotia, Canada, on Lake Banook. The competition was organized by the International Canoe Federation (ICF). The Canadian city was selected to host the championships in October 2003 after having done so previously in 1997. Final preparations were made after the 2008 Summer Olympics in Beijing, with competition format changed for the first time since the 2001 championships. Four exhibition events for both paddleability and women's canoe were added. Sponsorship was local within the province of Nova Scotia and the Halifax Regional Municipality. Media coverage was provided from Canada, Europe and the United States on the Internet, television and mobile phone. 669 canoeists from 68 nations participated at the championships themselves.

Germany won the most medals with 18 medals and seven golds. Men's canoe's overall winner was Russia with seven medals (one gold, five silver and one bronze). In men's kayak, the big winner was Germany with five medals (three golds, one silver and one bronze). Hungary won medals in all nine events of women's kayak. Athlete comments ranged from disgust over the format adjustment made to the canoe sprint program for the 2012 Summer Olympics to not being upset at all. Paddleability's success at these championships will hopefully push for inclusion into future Paralympic level events.

Women's Canoe events were introduced for the first time at an ICF Canoe Sprint World Championships in 2009 as exhibition events.

Explanation of events
Canoe sprint competitions are broken up into canoe (C), an open canoe with a single-blade paddle, or in kayaks (K), a closed canoe with a double-bladed paddle. Each canoe or kayak can hold one person (1), two people (2), or four people (4). When a competition is listed as a C-2 500 m event as an example, it means two people are in a canoe competing at a  distance.

Preliminaries to the event
Dartmouth was awarded the 2009 championships at an ICF Board of Directors meeting in Madrid, Spain, on 23 October 2003.

Event format changes
At the 2008 ICF Congress in Rome, a new program for the championships was approved. This marked the first change in the program since the addition of the K-4 1000 m women's event at the 2001 championships in Poznań. Men's C-4 500 m, men's K-4 500 m, women's K-4 1000 m events were replaced by C-1 4 × 200 m relay (men only) and K-1 4 × 200 m relay (both men and women). Women's C-1 200 m, C-1 500 m, C-2 200 m and C-2 500 m events were shown as exhibition. Paddleability exhibition events of K-1 200 m LTA (men & women), K-2 200 m TA&A (mixed), and C-2 200 m LTA&A (mixed) also took place (LTATA – Legs, Trunks, and Arms or Trunks and Arms; LTA – Legs, Trunks, and Arms; and TA&A – Trunks and Arms, or Arms). Support for women's Canadian and the paddle ability events were confirmed at an ICF Board of Directors meeting in Lausanne, Switzerland, on 18–20 March 2009. A training camp was held for women's canoe in conjunction with the championships.

Official meetings
In January 2009, ICF Secretary General Simon Toulson visited Halifax for three days and was impressed with the history of canoeing in the area and the development of future canoeists for Canada. Two public meetings were held in Dartmouth and Halifax on 24 and 26 March regarding the championships.

Facility
During the end of 2008, Lake Banook had its canoe course upgraded by Dexter Construction Limited. Water that had been pumped out of lake ceased on 15 December 2008, allowing the lake to rise back to its regular level by February 2009. Cleanup, restoration and landscaping was completed in the spring of 2009. Starting gates were tested during the second national team trials held at the lake on 27–28 June 2009. Temporary grandstands for 20,000 spectators per day were also constructed.

Additional changes were for environmental reasons. This included the Halifax Regional Water Commission, Conserve Nova Scotia, and Nova Scotia Environment providing water stations for athletes, spectators and volunteers to fill up reusable water bottles which were purchased on site. Dalhousie University's residence halls used energy efficient lighting and cleaning products. A buy local policy and delivery truck that ran entirely on vegetable oil fuel was also used.

According to a 10 August 2009 press release, the staging area was at Birch Cove Park in Halifax. 669 from 68 countries competed at the championships with an estimated 100,000 spectators.

Sponsorships
The Atlantic Lottery Corporation presented the "Women in Canoe" program that included 21 female canoeists from 12 different countries. Festival entertainment was sponsored by the Nova Scotia Gaming Corporation, including a "Concert on the Lake" by Matt Mays on 14 August that drew 10,000 spectators. Other sponsors include Bell Aliant as presenters, silver sponsors were The Chronicle Herald of Halifax, CFRQ Q104 FM radio, CBC Sports and the Halifax Water Authority; the bronze sponsors were NOREX, Helly Hansen, Conserve Nova Scotia, Nova Scotia environment, Mills fashion and NELO; government sponsorship of Department of Canadian Heritage, Nova Scotia Health Promotion and Protection, and the Halifax Regional Municipality; other supporters of Mic Mac Mall, CBS Outdoor, Metro Transit of Halifax, and Office Interiors; and friends of Ambassadors, Priority Management, KayakPro, the Office of Aboriginal Affairs, and The Cider House Company Limited.

Participating nations
68 nations were listed on the preliminary entry list. The numbers in parentheses shown are for men and women who competed for each respective nation.

Russia had the most overall attendees with 46 while Canada topped the number of women competing with 16.

The media guide listed 71 nations as participating, but seven nations listed did not compete (Cameroon, Dominican Republic, Montenegro, Nigeria, South Korea, Togo and Uganda) while four nations who competed were not listed (Ghana, Kyrgyzstan, Senegal and Tajikistan).

The ICF sponsored ten athletes in a development program in Romania in early 2009 that allowed them to compete at the world championships. These countries included Algeria, Armenia, Sri Lanka, and Thailand.

Coverage
Media coverage was provided by the Canadian Broadcasting Corporation (CBC) Sports in Canada, Eurosport, and Universal Sports in the United States. Live results were provided onsite from the official website that was sponsored by Bell Aliant which ran 9 am to 4:30 pm AST on 13 August, 9 AM to 3:55 pm AST on 14 August, 8:44 am to 5:45 pm AST on 15 August 2009, and 8:30 am to 3:46 pm AST on 16 August. Championship information was also available on Twitter. CBC Sports had broadcast times of 2–3 PM AST on 15 August 2009 followed by late night coverage at 12:30 am AST on 16 August 2009 along with coverage on the web at http://www.cbcsports.ca. Universal Sports telecasted the finals for both the 15th and the 16th live and are now seen on demand on their website. A total of 30 million people from 36 countries worldwide watched the event on television.

Results were transmitted for free with mobile web application named ZAP result. This mobile widget was developed by Norex.ca.

Schedule

Opening and closing ceremonies
Opening ceremonies took place at 8 pm AST on 12 August. 10,000 people watched 68 countries participate in the opening ceremonies that included Canoe'09 chair Chris Keevill, ICF President José Perurena, and Sport Canada minister Gary Lunn. The Concert on the Lake took place at 8 pm AST on 14 August with over 10,000 attendees. Closing ceremonies occurred on 16 August at 4 pm AST. Medals were presented in Mi'kmaq baskets for gold medalists, traditional European baskets for silver medalists, and in traditional African Nova Scotian baskets for bronze medalists. Mi'kmaq is a territory in the Atlantic Provinces of Canada prior to the settlement by the French in the 17th century. The settlement was rotated between the French and British between 1627 and 1755 before the British took over the area after the French and Indian War. Africans settled in Nova Scotia during the Atlantic slave trade that ran from the 16th to 19th centuries. The closing ceremonies on 16 August included passing the ICF flag from Dartmouth to the 2010 world championship hosts in Poznań.

Festival performances
Festivals for all four days started 30 minutes before the first race and ended 30 minutes after the last race each day. Live entertainment took place each of the days along with vendors, displays and exhibits. Boating safety was discussed along with interactive exhibits on canoe construction and allowing to touch live animals from around the world, including tarantulas and a -long python.

Competition schedule

Men's canoe

Men's kayak

Women's kayak

Women's canoe (exhibition)

Paddleability (exhibition)

Results
The preliminary draw was released on 9 August. This was updated again on 11 August.

Men's
 Non-Olympic classes

Canoe
Russia was the top winner with seven medals with Nikolay Lipkin winning five medals. Belarus won three gold medals. Azerbaijan won a complete set of medals in the canoe discipline while Uzbekistan won its first ever gold medal at the championships.

Kayak
Germany won five medals in the men's kayak. Ronald Rauhe's three medals for Germany at these championships pushed his career total to 20, tying him with Torsten Gutsche (East Germany-Germany: 1989–99). Belarus won four golds with Vadzim Makhneu and Raman Piatrushenka each winning four of those golds.

Women's
 Non-Olympic classes

Kayak
Hungary medaled in all nine events with Natasa Janics and Katalin Kovacs each winning five medals. Kovacs' five medals pushed her total medal count to 35, three behind Birgit Fischer's 38 (East Germany-Germany: 1978–2005). Bridgette Hartley's bronze medal in the K-1 1000 m event was the first for both South Africa and Africa at the world championships. Josefa Idem's bronze in the K-1 500 m event makes her the oldest medalist in the history of the championships.

Exhibition

Women's canoe
Host nation Canada won all four of the exhibition events. Jenna Marks won three of these events (C-1 200 m, C-2 200 m, C-2 500 m). Other nations with top three finishes included Brazil, Ecuador, Great Britain and the United States. How about Russia?

Paddleability
Italy had four top three finishes to lead all nations in this event while the United States was second with three.

Aftermath

Athlete comments
Australia's Wallace commented that he was upset at the ICF's decision that was made during the championships to replace the men's 500 m events (C-1, C-2, K-1 and K-2) at the Summer Olympics with the 200 m events (men's C-1, K-1 and K-2; and women's K-1) for the upcoming Summer Olympics in London. Kovacs of Hungary stated that the addition of the women's K-1 200 m event for the 2012 Olympics will not change her training routine. Italy's Idem, who was competing in her 20th world championships, stated that she was just as "...nervous when ...[she]... was a 13-year-old girl (1977) and ...[she was]... the same today." Germany's Rauhe expressed his love for Canada by "...going on holiday now." in the host nation.

Paddleability's (Paracanoe's) future
In a 25 August 2009 ICF article, ICF Canoeing for All Committee and Canoe Kayak Canada's Domestic Development Director John Edwards thanked efforts of the paddlers involved in the paddleability events for the 2009 championships. Edwards stated that the efforts for paddleability's success are twofold. The first is for inclusion into the 2011 Special Olympics World Summer Games in Athens, Greece. Once this is recognized, the next goal is to get Special Olympic programs at a national level for inclusion into the 2016 Summer Paralympics. The second, a shorter-term one, is to have 24 nations from three continents participate at next year's canoe sprint world championships in Poznań. Besides the medalists from this year's world championships being from Italy, the United States, Canada, Brazil and France, other participants included Great Britain and Portugal. The process to include paddleability into the 2016 Summer Paralympics in Rio de Janeiro, Brazil began on 1 October 2009 and approval was reached on 16 July 2010.

Medal table 
Shown for the non-exhibition events only.

See also
Canoeing at the 2008 Summer Olympics

References

External links
International Canoe Federation
Official website

Icf Canoe Sprint World Championships, 2009
Icf Canoe Sprint World Championships, 2009
ICF Canoe Sprint World Championships
International sports competitions hosted by Canada
Canoeing and kayaking competitions in Canada
Sport in Dartmouth, Nova Scotia